Sveti Lovreč Labinski ( / ) is a small hamlet in Raša municipality, Istria County, Croatia. The church, built in the early 17th century, is also the Parish church and has the same name as the hamlet. During the Austria-Hungary occupation, it belonged to the municipality of Vlahovo, just west of the Municipality of Cerovica. The population of St. Lovreć Labinski in 2011 was 55.

The hamlet includes two small settlements to the south, Diminići and Kobaviči, which, in the custom of the time, were named for the families who settled them.

In the mid-17th century, Sveti Lovreč had 32 houses.

See also
List of Italian exonyms in Istria

References

Populated places in Istria County
Istria County